A portmanteau word, or portmanteau is a blend of words in which parts of multiple words are combined into a new word, as in smog, coined by blending smoke and fog, or motel, from motor and hotel. In linguistics, a portmanteau is a single morph that is analyzed as representing two (or more) underlying morphemes. When portmanteaus shorten established compounds, they can be considered clipped compounds.

A portmanteau word is similar to a contraction, but contractions are formed from words that would otherwise appear together in sequence, such as do and not to make don't, whereas a portmanteau is formed by combining two or more existing words that all relate to a single concept. A portmanteau also differs from a compound, which does not involve the truncation of parts of the stems of the blended words. For instance, starfish is a compound, not a portmanteau, of star and fish, as it includes both words in full. If it were called a "stish" or a "starsh", it would be a portmanteau.

Origin 
The word portmanteau was introduced in this sense by Lewis Carroll in the book Through the Looking-Glass (1871), where Humpty Dumpty explains to Alice the coinage of unusual words used in "Jabberwocky". Slithy means "slimy and lithe" and mimsy means "miserable and flimsy". Humpty Dumpty explains to Alice the practice of combining words in various ways, comparing it to the then-common type of luggage, which opens into two equal parts:

In his introduction to his 1876 poem The Hunting of the Snark, Carroll again uses portmanteau when discussing lexical selection:

In then-contemporary English, a portmanteau was a suitcase that opened into two equal sections. According to the OED Online, a portmanteau is a "case or bag for carrying clothing and other belongings when travelling; (originally) one of a form suitable for carrying on horseback; (now esp.) one in the form of a stiff leather case hinged at the back to open into two equal parts". According to the OED Online, the etymology of the word is the "officer who carries the mantle of a person in a high position (1507 in Middle French), case or bag for carrying clothing (1547), clothes rack (1640)".

An occasional synonym for "portmanteau word" is frankenword, an autological word exemplifying the phenomenon it describes, blending "Frankenstein" and "word".

Examples in English 

Many neologisms are examples of blends, but many blends have become part of the lexicon. In Punch in 1896, the word brunch (breakfast + lunch) was introduced as a "portmanteau word". In 1964, the newly independent African republic of Tanganyika and Zanzibar chose the portmanteau word Tanzania as its name. Similarly Eurasia is a portmanteau of Europe and Asia.

Some city names are portmanteaus of the border regions they straddle: Texarkana spreads across the Texas-Arkansas-Louisiana border, while Calexico and Mexicali are respectively the American and Mexican sides of a single conurbation. A scientific example is a liger, which is a cross between a male lion and a female tiger (a tigon is a similar cross in which the male is a tiger).

Jeoportmanteau! is a recurring category on the American television quiz show Jeopardy! The category's name is itself a portmanteau of the words Jeopardy and portmanteau. Responses in the category are portmanteaus constructed by fitting two words together.

Portmanteau words may be produced by joining proper nouns with common nouns, such as "gerrymandering", which refers to the scheme of Massachusetts Governor Elbridge Gerry for politically contrived redistricting; the perimeter of one of the districts thereby created resembled a very curvy salamander in outline. The term gerrymander has itself contributed to portmanteau terms bjelkemander and playmander.

Oxbridge is a common portmanteau for the UK's two oldest universities, those of Oxford and Cambridge. In 2016, Britain's planned exit from the European Union became known as "Brexit".

The word refudiate was famously used by Sarah Palin when she misspoke, conflating the words refute and repudiate. Though the word was a gaffe, it was recognized as the New Oxford American Dictionarys "Word of the Year" in 2010.

The business lexicon includes words like "advertainment" (advertising as entertainment), "advertorial" (a blurred distinction between advertising and editorial), "infotainment" (information about entertainment or itself intended to entertain by its manner of presentation), and "infomercial" (informational commercial).

Company and product names may also use portmanteau words: examples include Timex (a portmanteau of Time [referring to Time magazine] and Kleenex), Renault's Twingo (a combination of twist, swing and tango), and Garmin (portmanteau of company founders' first names Gary Burrell and Min Kao). "Desilu Productions" was a Los Angeles–based company jointly owned by actor couple Desi Arnaz and Lucille Ball. Miramax is the combination of the first names of the parents of the Weinstein brothers.

Name-meshing 

Two proper names can also be used in creating a portmanteau word in reference to the partnership between people, especially in cases where both persons are well-known, or sometimes to produce epithets such as "Billary" (referring to former United States president Bill Clinton and his wife, former United States Secretary of State Hillary Clinton). In this example of recent American political history, the purpose for blending is not so much to combine the meanings of the source words but "to suggest a resemblance of one named person to the other"; the effect is often derogatory, as linguist Benjamin Zimmer states. For instance, Putler is used by critics of Vladimir Putin, merging his name with Adolf Hitler. By contrast, the public, including the media, use portmanteaus to refer to their favorite pairings as a way to "...giv[e] people an essence of who they are within the same name." This is particularly seen in cases of fictional and real-life "supercouples". An early known example, Bennifer, referred to film stars Ben Affleck and Jennifer Lopez. Other examples include Brangelina (Brad Pitt and Angelina Jolie) and TomKat (Tom Cruise and Katie Holmes). On Wednesday, 28 June 2017, The New York Times crossword included the quip, "How I wish Natalie Portman dated Jacques Cousteau, so I could call them 'Portmanteau'".

Holidays are another example, as in Thanksgivukkah, a portmanteau neologism given to the convergence of the American holiday of Thanksgiving and the first day of the Jewish holiday of Hanukkah on Thursday, 28 November 2013. Chrismukkah is another pop-culture portmanteau neologism popularized by the TV drama The O.C., merging of the holidays of Christianity's Christmas and Judaism's Hanukkah.

In the Disney film Big Hero 6, the film is situated in a fictitious city called "San Fransokyo", which is a portmanteau of two real locations, San Francisco and Tokyo.

Other languages

Modern Hebrew 
Modern Hebrew abounds with blending. Other blends in Hebrew include the following:

Sometimes the root of the second word is truncated, giving rise to a blend that resembles an acrostic:

Irish
A few portmanteaus are in use in modern Irish, for example:

Icelandic 
There is a tradition of linguistic purism in Icelandic, and neologisms are frequently created from pre-existing words. For example,  'computer' is a portmanteau of  'digit, number' and  'oracle, seeress'.

Indonesian 

In Indonesian, portmanteaus and acronyms are very common in both formal and informal usage.

Malaysian 
In the Malaysian national language of Bahasa Melayu, the word jadong was constructed out of three Malay words for evil (jahat), stupid (bodoh) and arrogant (sombong) to be used on the worst kinds of community and religious leaders who mislead naive, submissive and powerless folk under their thrall.

Japanese 

A very common type of portmanteau in Japanese forms one word from the beginnings of two others (that is, from two back-clippings). The portion of each input word retained is usually two morae, which is tantamount to one kanji in most words written in kanji.

The inputs to the process can be native words, Sino-Japanese words, gairaigo (later borrowings), or combinations thereof. A Sino-Japanese example is the name  for the University of Tokyo, in full . The Japanese fad of egg-shaped keychain pet toys from the 1990s, Tamagotchi, is a portmanteau combining the two Japanese words tamago (たまご), which means "egg", and uotchi (ウオッチ) "watch". The portmanteau can also be seen as a combination of tamago (たまご), "egg", and tomodachi (友だち), which means "friend".

Some titles also are portmanteaus, such as Hetalia (ヘタリア). It came from Hetare (ヘタレ), which means "idiot", and Italia (イタリア) which means Italy. Another example is Servamp,
which came from the English words Servant (サーヴァント) and Vampire (ヴァンパイア).

Portuguese
In Brazilian Portuguese, portmanteaus are usually slang, including:
 Cantriz, from cantora (female singer) and atriz (actress), which defines women that both sing and act.
 Aborrescente, from aborrecer (annoy) and adolescente (teenager), which is a pejorative term for teenagers.
 Pescotapa, from pescoço (neck) and tapa (slap), which defines a slap on the back of the neck.

In European Portuguese, portmanteaus are also used. Some of them include:

 Telemóvel, which means mobile phone, comes from telefone (telephone) and móvel (mobile).
 Cantautor, which means Singer-songwriter, and comes from cantor (singer) and autor (songwriter).

 Spanish 

Although traditionally uncommon in Spanish, portmanteaus are increasingly finding their way into the language, mainly for marketing and commercial purposes. Portmanteaus are also frequently used to make commercial brands, such as "chocolleta" from "chocolate" + "galleta." They are also often used to create business company names, especially for small, family-owned businesses, where owners' names are combined to create a unique name (such as Rocar, from "Roberto" + "Carlos", or Mafer, from "María" + "Fernanda"). These usages are helpful for registering of a distinguishable trademark.

Other examples:
 Cantautor, which means Singer-songwriter, and comes from cantante (singer) and autor (songwriter).
Mecatrónica and Ofimática two Neologisms that are blends of mecánica (mechanical) with electrónica (electronics), and oficina (office) with informática (informatics) respectively.
Espanglish, interlanguage that combines words from both Spanish (Español) and English.
Metrobús, blend of metro (subway) and autobús.
Autopista, blend of automóvil (car) and pista (highway).
Company names and brands with portmanteaus are common in Spanish. Some examples of Spanish portmanteaus for Mexican companies include: The Mexican flag carrier Aeroméxico, (Aerovías de México), Banorte (Bank and North), Cemex (Cement and Mexico), Jumex (Jugos Mexicanos or Mexican Juice), Mabe (from founders Egon MAbardi and Francisco BErrondo), Pemex (Petróleos Mexicanos or Mexican Oil), Softtek (portmanteau and stylization of Software and technology), and Telmex (Teléfonos de Mexico). Gamesa (Galletera Mexicana, S.A. or Mexican Biscuit Company, Inc.) and Famsa (fabricantes Muebleros, S.A.) are examples of portmanteaus of four words, including the "S.A." (Sociedad Anónima).
Many more portmanteaus in Spanish come from Anglicisms, which are words borrowed from English, like módem, transistor, códec, email, internet or emoticon.

It was the prize on the Spanish version of the children TV show Child's Play that ran on the public television channel La 1 of Televisión Española (TVE) from 1988 to 1992.

 Portmanteau morph 
In linguistics, a blend is an amalgamation or fusion of independent lexemes, while a portmanteau or portmanteau morph is a single morph that is analyzed as representing two (or more) underlying morphemes. For example, in the Latin word , the ending  is a portmanteau morph because it is used for two morphemes: the singular number and the genitive case. In English, two separate morphs are used: of an animal. Other examples include  →   and  →  .

See also 

 Amalgamation (names)
 Hybrid word
 List of geographic portmanteaus
 List of portmanteaus
 Portmanteau sentence
 Syllabic abbreviation
 Pidgin

References

External links 

 
1870s neologisms